Jo Paul Ancheri (born 2 August 1976) is an Indian former professional football player who captained the Indian Football team. He was named the AIFF Player of the Year by the All India Football Federation in 1994 and 2001. He currently works as a Malayalam commentator and pundit on Star Sports Malayalam with the leading commentator Shaiju Damodaran.

Club career
Born in Thrissur, Kerala, Ancheri began his professional career in 1992 playing for State Bank of Travancore. He went on to play for many leading football clubs including Mohun Bagan, JCT Football Club, FC Kochin, and East Bengal. He was a versatile player who could play in any position including defender, defensive midfielder, midfielder, and striker. With JCT Mills Phagwara, he won the 1996–97 National Football League.

International career
Ancheri made his senior international debut for India against Bangladesh on 14 September 1994 in a 4–2 win, when he scored a goal.

Ancheri was also a member of the Indian team for the Nehru Gold Cup in Calcutta, and of the under-23 side, which took part in the pre-Olympic tournament. He later suffered a knee injury for the rest of the season and came back with the colours of FC Kochin in 1997.

Ancheri played in a number of tournaments such as FIFA World Cup qualifiers, the SAFF Championship, and the South Asian Games, and helped the team win the South Asian Football Federation Cup in 1999.

He was part of the Syed Naeemuddin-managed Indian team that participated in the 1998 Asian Games in Bangkok and reached the second round.

With India, he appeared in the 2002 World Cup Qualifiers, when India defeated teams like United Arab Emirates, Brunei and Yemen. India secured 11 points from 6 matches, the same as Yemen, but finished behind them due to an inferior goal difference. In that year, Ancheri was part of the Bhaichung Bhutia-led Indian team that won the LG Cup, defeating the host nation Vietnam 3–2. He later appeared in the 2003 Afro-Asian Games, when India finished as runners-up behind Uzbekistan.

International goals

Honours
JCT Mills
 National Football League: 1996–97
 Indian Federation Cup: 1996
 Durand Cup: 1996
FC Kochin
 Durand Cup: 1997
 IFA Shield: runner-up 1997
 Kerala State Championship: 1997
Mohun Bagan
 Indian Federation Cup: 1998
 IFA Shield: 1998, 1999
East Bengal
 IFA Shield: 2001
 Durand Cup: 2001, 2002

India
 SAFF Championship: 1997, 1999, 2005; runner-up: 1995; third place: 2003
 South Asian Games Gold medal: 1995; Bronze medal: 1999
 LG Cup: 2002

India U23
 LG Cup: 2002

Individual
 AIFF Player of the Year: 1994, 2001

See also
List of India international footballers
List of India national football team captains

References

Bibliography

External links
Jo Paul Ancheri at Soccerway
Biography at indianhotdeal.com

Living people
1975 births
Indian footballers
India international footballers
India youth international footballers
Malayali people
Footballers from Thrissur
East Bengal Club players
Sree Kerala Varma College alumni
Footballers at the 1998 Asian Games
Footballers at the 2002 Asian Games
Association football utility players
Association football defenders
Association football midfielders
Association football forwards
Asian Games competitors for India
Association football commentators
Indian sports broadcasters
South Asian Games medalists in football
South Asian Games gold medalists for India
South Asian Games bronze medalists for India